"Love Train" is a song by English singer Holly Johnson, released in 1989 as the lead single from his debut solo album, Blast (1989). It was written by Johnson and produced by Andy Richards and Steve Lovell with additional production by Stephen Hague. The song reached  4 in the United Kingdom, spending 11 weeks on the chart, and was certified silver by British Phonographic Industry (BPI) in February 1989. In the United States, the song reached No. 65 on the Billboard Hot 100.

"Love Train" features a guitar solo from Queen guitarist Brian May and backing vocals from Don Snow and Lance Ellington. The single's B-side, "Murder in Paradise", is a non-album track exclusive to the single. A music video was filmed to promote the single, directed by Marco Cerere, and Johnson performed the song on the UK music show Top of the Pops.

Critical reception
On its release, Terry Staunton of New Musical Express picked "Love Train" as "single of the week" in the issue of 7 January 1989. He described it as "the most out-and-out pop song Holly's ever sung" and predicted it would reach the UK top 5. He wrote, "'Love Train' is four minutes of bouncy bliss which finds him in fine voice. Pretty corny lyrics about stoking it up and getting on board roll off the tongue and into our hearts as a nation goes apeshit on the dancefloor." Jerry Smith of Music Week praised it as "a strikingly elegant dance track" and noted Johnson's "soaring vocals" are "encased in a shimmering designer sound that should ensure success".

In a review of Blast, Steve Sutherland of Melody Maker commented, "Blast is essentially a dance LP. There are exceptions but mostly it's smart, ankle-shuffling stuff like the cute mini-masterpiece of pneumatic innuendo, 'Love Train'." Johnny Dee of Record Mirror described the song as "the perfect commercial pop song". American newspaper Record-Journal wrote, "Best songs are cuts such as 'Love Train,' where Holly shows that soul and dance music are not necessarily exclusive of each other. If Simply Red had any energy these days, this is how Mick Hucknall would sound." In May 1989, Billboard picked the song as "new and noteworthy". They pointed out the song's "lyrical hook and percolating rhythm charm".

Track listings

 7-inch single and US cassette single
 "Love Train"
 "Murder in Paradise"

 12-inch, CD, and UK cassette single
 "Love Train" (Ride the "A" Train) – 6:53
 "Love Train (Stoke It Up)" (7-inch mix) – 4:02
 "Murder in Paradise" – 4:27

 European mini-CD single
 "Love Train" (12-inch mix) – 6:53
 "Love Train" (7-inch mix) – 4:02
 "Murder in Paradise" – 4:27

 US remix 12-inch single
 "Love Train" (Americana Big Beat version) – 6:35
 "Love Train" (Iron-Horse instrumental) – 5:00
 "Love Train" (Americana 12-inch version) – 6:20
 "Love Train" (Bonus Big Beat radio version) – 4:30
 "Love Train" (Americana Pop version) – 4:00

Personnel

"Love Train"
 Producer – Andy Richards, Steve Lovell
 Additional Producer, Mixer – Stephen Hague
 Keyboard Programming – Andy Richards, Marius de Vries
 Engineer – Dave Meegan, Mike "Spike" Drake, Tony Phillips
 Vocals - Holly Johnson
 Backing Vocals – Don Snow, Lance Ellington
 Guitar – Brian May, Neil Taylor
 Writer – Holly Johnson
 Single Artwork – Accident

"Murder in Paradise"
 Producer – Holly Johnson
 Arranger – Guy Chambers, Holly Johnson, Nick Bagnall
 Keyboard Programming – Holly Johnson, Nick Bagnall, Guy Chambers
 Engineer – Tim Hunt
 Vocals - Holly Johnson
 Guitar – Nick Bagnall
 Writer – Holly Johnson

Charts

Weekly charts

Year-end charts

References

1989 singles
1989 songs
Holly Johnson songs
MCA Records singles
Songs written by Holly Johnson